Ligamen is, in Roman Catholic canon law, an existing marriage tie, which constitutes an impediment to the contracting of a second marriage.

Description
Ligamen comes from the Latin word meaning "bond". The existence of a previous valid marriage at the moment of contracting a second entails of itself the invalidity of the latter.

If one of the parties of a divorced couple (the Petitioner) then wishes to enter into a sacramental marriage with a third party and can show that his/her former spouse (the Respondent) had been previously married, that the spouse in the previous marriage (the Co-Respondent) was alive at the time of the second marriage, and that the Church had not declared the first marriage null, Respondent's first marriage is presumed valid. The Petitioner may file a Ligamen procedure for a determination that his/her marriage was invalid since the former spouse had an existing prior marriage bond precluding them from contracting a valid second marriage.

A putative marriage must be presumed valid, and so constituting the impediment of ligamen, until it is proven invalid.

Should the second marriage have been contracted in good faith, if only by one party, and it subsequently appear that the first spouse still lived, then the second marriage would not only be invalid, but the parties to it must be separated by the ecclesiastical authorities, and the first marriage re-established. However, the second and invalid marriage would enjoy the advantage of being putative marriage. This second marriage, though illegal during the lifetime of the first spouse, may be validly contracted after his or her death; indeed, should the party who acted bona fide demand it, the guilty one is then bound to contract marriage validly with the petitioner.

Since monogamy and the indissolubility of marriage are founded on the natural law, this impediment of ligamen is binding also on non-Catholics and on the unbaptized. If an unbaptized person living in polygamy becomes a Christian, he must keep the wife he had first married and release the second, in case the first wife is converted with him. Otherwise, by virtue of the "Pauline privilege", the converted husband may choose that one of his wives who allows herself to be baptized.

See also
Bigamy

References

External links

 "The Ligamen Process", Catholic Diocese of Arlington

Catholic matrimonial canon law
Impediments (Catholic canon law)
Catholic Church legal terminology